The 2014 Epping Forest District Council election took place on 22 May 2014 to elect members of Epping Forest District Council in England. This was on the same day as other local elections and the European Parliament elections.

By-elections

Waltham Abbey Honey Lane by-election

Ward results 
Detailed below are all of the candidates nominated to stand in each ward in the 2014 district election. Most figures are compared to the last time these seats were contested in any election cycle for the Epping Forest District Council election:

Buckhurst Hill East

Buckhurst Hill West

Chigwell Village

Chipping Ongar, Greensted & Marden Ash

Epping Hemnall

Epping Lindsay & Thornwood Common

Grange Hill

Loughton Alderton

Loughton Broadway

Loughton Fairmead

Loughton Forest

Loughton Roding

Loughton St. John's

Loughton St. Mary's

Lower Nazeing

North Weald Bassett

Theydon Bois

Waltham Abbey Honey Lane

Waltham Abbey Paternoster

References

2014 English local elections
2014
2010s in Essex